Coleophora breviuscula is a moth of the family Coleophoridae. It is found in Switzerland, Italy, Greece and Asia Minor.

References

breviuscula
Moths described in 1880
Moths of Europe
Moths of Asia